Osama A. Badary is an Egyptian professor of Clinical Pharmacy at the British University in Egypt. He is the Vice Dean Pharmaceutical Research Faculty of Pharmacy, former Vice Dean Postgraduate Studies and Research, and the former Chairman of National Organization for Drug Control and Research (NODCAR), Cairo, Egypt.

Education 

He obtained his first degree in Pharmaceutical Sciences, from the Faculty of Pharmacy Cairo University in 1983. In 1986, he obtained a diploma in Biochemical Analysis from a similar Faculty at Al- Azhar University, Egypt in 1986. In 1988, he bagged his Master's degree in Pharmaceutical Sciences with specialty in Pharmacology and Toxicology from Al-Azhar University, Egypt. In 1991, he obtained his PhD Pharmaceutical Sciences from Al-Azhar University and the University of Georgia.

Career 
In 2002, Badary became the Head of Department of Pharmacology and Toxicology, Faculty of Pharmacy, Helwan University, Helwan, Cairo, Egypt. In 2006, he was appointed as the Vice Dean of the same Faculty. In 2013, he was nominated as the  Chairman of National Organization for Drug Control and Research, Cairo and in 2019, he was appointed as Vice Dean of Pharmaceutical Research Faculty of Pharmacy, the British University in Egypt BUE Cairo Egypt. 
He is a member of the Alexander von Humboldt Foundation, Deutscher Akademischer Austauschd and Union for International Cancer Control and American Association for Cancer Research.

References 

Egyptian scientists
Egyptian academics
Egyptian academic administrators
Living people
Cairo University alumni
Year of birth missing (living people)